John Lapsley (born 24 November 1951) is a Scottish former footballer, who played for several Scottish Football League clubs in the 1970s and 1980s. Most of his league appearances were made with Airdrieonians, who he played for in  the 1975 Scottish Cup Final.

External links

1951 births
Living people
Scottish footballers
Airdrieonians F.C. (1878) players
Partick Thistle F.C. players
Ayr United F.C. players
East Stirlingshire F.C. players
Stenhousemuir F.C. players
Cowdenbeath F.C. players
Hamilton Academical F.C. players
Falkirk F.C. players
Dunfermline Athletic F.C. players
Brechin City F.C. players
Scottish Football League players
Association football fullbacks
Footballers from Edinburgh
Linlithgow Rose F.C. players